An  is a municipality designated by the Japanese government to be a model for making large cuts in greenhouse gas emissions towards the realization of a low-carbon society.

Current environmental model cities
 Obihiro, Hokkaido
 Shimokawa, Hokkaido
 Yokohama, Kanagawa Prefecture
 Toyama, Toyama Prefecture
 Kitakyushu, Fukuoka Prefecture
 Minamata, Kumamoto Prefecture
The above municipalities were designated on July 22, 2008.
 Chiyoda, Tokyo Prefecture
 Iida, Nagano Prefecture
 Toyota, Aichi Prefecture
 Kyoto, Kyoto Prefecture
 Sakai, Osaka Prefecture
 Yusuhara, Kōchi Prefecture
 Miyakojima, Okinawa Prefecture
The above municipalities were designated on January 22, 2009.

Cities in Japan

Low-carbon economy